The Irish Open (currently known as the Horizon Irish Open for sponsorship reasons) is a professional golf tournament on the European Tour.

The Irish Open was first played in 1927 and was played annually, except for the war years, until 1950. There was a tournament in 1953, but the event was then not played again until revived in 1975. It has been contested annually since then. From 1963 to 1974 Carroll's sponsored a tournament, generally called the Carroll's International and in 1975 they became the sponsor of the Irish Open which became known as the Carroll's Irish Open.

The Irish Open is one of the European Tour Rolex Series events. The Rolex Series started in 2017, with each tournament in the series having a minimum prize fund of $7 million. The date was moved to early July, two weeks before The Open Championship.

Since 2014 (except in 2016), it has been one of the Open Qualifying Series with the leading three players who have not already qualified and who finish in the top ten, qualifying for The Open Championship.

History

The first Irish Open in 1927 was played at Portmarnock Golf Club from 16 to 18 August. There were 18 holes played on the first two days with the leading 60 players and ties playing a further 36 holes on the final day. In a stiff breeze local professional Willie Nolan led after the first day with a course record 72. On the second day Nolan faded after an 83 and the lead was taken by Henry Cotton on 146 with Jack Smith a shot behind. The cut was 165 and exactly 60 players qualified, including 6 amateurs. Conditions were very poor on the final day with the refreshment and press tents blown down and rain falling in torrents. Jack Smith had an excellent 77 in the morning and with Henry Cotton taking 86, Smith had an eight-shot lead over Cotton and Archie Compston. Smith, however, went to pieces and had a final round of 91 and was overtaken by Cotton, who took 81. George Duncan, starting the final round 14 shots behind, scored 74 and finished with a total of 312, beating Smith by three and Cotton by one. Duncan's score of 74 was remarkable in that it was only two strokes over the new course record, on a day when his 74 and Smith's 77 in the morning were the only two rounds under 80 on the final day. Duncan took the Championship Gold Medal and the first prize of £150. Nolan was the leading Irishman, finishing fifth.

After Duncan's win in 1927, the event was dominated by English golfers, the only other non-English winner before World War II being Bobby Locke in 1938. Ernest Whitcombe won in 1928, the first of four wins by the Whitcombe brothers; Ernest won again in 1935 while Charles won in 1930 and Reg won in 1936. Ernest Whitcombe had rounds of 68 and 69 on the first two days of the 1928 event, to take a seven stroke lead. Rounds of 73 and 78 on the final day were enough to give him a four stroke victory. The 1929 championship was played again at Portmarnock and resulted in a three-way tie on 309, just 3 strokes better than Duncan's score there in 1927. There was a 36-hole playoff the following day. Abe Mitchell and Archie Compston were level after the first round on 75 with Len Holland five behind. Mitchell scored another 75 in the afternoon to win by two strokes from Compston and ten from Holland. Charles Whitcombe dominated the 1930 tournament, winning by 8 strokes from defending champion Abe Mitchell. Whitcombe led by four after the first two rounds and full away further on the final day. the 1931 championship was won by a relative unknown, Bob Kenyon, who won by two after a final round 70. Five players tied for second place, including Ernest Whitcombe who finished with a course-record 66 on the Royal Dublin links.

Alf Padgham won in 1932 with steady rounds of 71-71-71-70, one ahead of Bill Davies. Bob Kenyon won for the second time in 1933. Defending champion Padgham had led after two rounds but had a disappointing third round 76 and finished runner-up, two behind. Syd Easterbrook won at Portmarnock in 1934 with a total of 284, 25 better than the winning score there in 1929, to win by 7 strokes from the Irish amateur, Joe Brown, who.recorded the best finish by an Irish golfer at that time. Two of the Whitcombe brothers, Ernest and Reg, tied in 1935. Bob Kenyon had a good chance to win for the third time but had 5s at the last two holes to finish a shot behind. In the playoff Reg had a bad start, taking 7 at the first hole. He recovered to be level early in the second round but had another 7 and Ernest eventually won by three strokes.

In 1932 and 1933, the Irish Open was preceded by an international match between teams of English and Irish professionals. England won the first match 16–2 and the second match 13–3 with two halves. The matches followed the same form as the England–Scotland Professional Match that had been played just before the Open Championship.

After his playoff loss in 1935, Reg Whitcombe won in 1936, two ahead of Bill Davies who was a runner-up for the third time. Whitcombe had final day rounds of 68 and 69 for a record low total of 281. Jimmy Adams seemed the likely winner at Royal Portrush in 1937 after finishing on 285.  However Bert Gadd finished with two 3s (eagle-birdie) to win by a shot. 20-year-old Bobby Locke, who had recently turned professional, broke the run of English winners in 1938. Henry Cotton had seemed the likely winner but finished 4-5-5-5 while Locke finished 2-4-4-4 and finished a stroke behind. Arthur Lees won in 1939 with a total 287 with Reg Whitcombe two behind. 19-year-old Irish amateur Jimmy Bruen led after two rounds but scored 75 and 81 on the final day to drop into 6th place, leading amateur for the third successive year.

When the event resumed at Portmarnock in 1946, Fred Daly became the first Irish winner. The tournament turned in a contest between Daly and Bobby Locke, Daly eventually winning by 4 strokes. No one else was within 10 shots of Daly. There was a second Irish winner at Royal Portrush in 1947 when Harry Bradshaw won the title, two ahead of Flory Van Donck. Max Faulkner led after three rounds but a final round 76 dropped him down to third place. Dai Rees won in 1948, his total of 295 being two better than Norman Von Nida. Faulkner again led after three round but a 77 left him tied for third place. Bradshaw won for a second time at Belvoir Park in 1949. Bobby Locke came close to matching him but finished a stroke behind. The 1950 tournament was won by the Australian Ossie Pickworth, two ahead of John Panton and Norman Von Nida.

The event was not held in 1951 or 1952 but was held again in 1953 at Belvoir Park. Eric Brown won with a score of 272, a stroke ahead of Harry Weetman. 22-year-old Peter Alliss had taken an early clubhouse lead on 274 but was eventually beaten by Weetman and then Brown, finishing in third place. After 1953, the event was not played again until 1975; plans to revive the tournament in 1970 were abandoned after backers Pepsi pulled out.

Since 1963 Carroll's had sponsored a major tournament, the Carroll's International at Woodbrook Golf Club, which had been a European Tour event since the tour started in 1972. For the 1975 European Tour season the Carroll's International was dropped and Carroll's became the sponsor of the revived Irish Open, which took its place on the tour and was played at Woodbrook in the first year. Christy O'Connor Jnr became the third Irish winner, finishing one ahead of Harry Bannerman, and took the first prize of £5,000.

Venues

 Connacht province has never hosted the event

Future venues

Source:

Tournament notes
The Irish Open has been played at a variety of dates from mid-May to the end of August, but since the start of the Rolex series in 2017 it has been held in early July, two weeks before the Open Championship.

The tournament enjoys one of the largest galleries on the European Tour. In 2010, the Irish Open at Killarney Golf & Fishing Club had an attendance of 85,179 over four days, second only to the BMW PGA Championship. In 2011, Killarney Golf & Fishing Club tallied in excess of 86,500 over four days. This was again the second highest on the European Tour to the BMW PGA Championship. In 2012, Royal Portrush Golf Club had a record attendance of 112,000 over four days; 131,000 over the six days. This was the only time a European Tour event had sold out prior to play on all four days and was the highest attendance ever recorded on the European Tour.

Since 2008, it has been the only European Tour event played in Ireland. The European Open was held at the K Club in Straffan for thirteen years from 1995 to 2007 while the 2007 Seve Trophy and the 2006 Ryder Cup were the last important men's professional team competitions played in Ireland.

In April 2022 it was announced that The K Club had agreed a long-term deal with the European Tour, seeing them host the tournament in 2023, 2025 and 2027.

Recent sponsorship
Following the departure of Nissan as title sponsor in 2006, Adare Golf Club, part of the Adare Manor Hotel and Golf Resort in County Limerick, had planned to host the tournament for three years, from 2007 to 2009. After two years, it was announced in January 2009 that they could no longer sustain the losses incurred by hosting the event for a third year. In early March, the European Tour confirmed the national championship would return to County Louth Golf Club, Baltray, which had last hosted in 2004, with a new sponsor, 3 Mobile.

Fáilte Ireland, the National Tourism Development Authority of the Republic of Ireland, agreed to sponsor in 2011, but with a reduced purse, cut in half to €1.5 million. In 2015 the event was sponsored by Dubai Duty Free in conjunction with the Rory Foundation. In October 2015, it was announced that Dubai Duty Free had extended their sponsorship to 2018 along with the Rory Foundation. In May 2018, it was announced that Dubai Duty Free would extend their sponsorship to 2022. In August 2021 it was announced that the prize money for the tournament would increase to €5 million from 2022.

In February 2022, it was announced that Horizon Therapeutics would become the new title sponsor in a six-year deal lasting until 2027.

Winners 

Sources:

Multiple winners

Notes

References

External links

Coverage on the European Tour's official site

 
European Tour events
Golf tournaments in Ireland
Annual sporting events in Ireland
Recurring sporting events established in 1927
1927 establishments in Ireland